Azangulovo (Aźanğol) is a rural locality (a village) in Novomeshcherovsky Selsoviet, Mechetlinsky District, Bashkortostan, Russia. The population was 326 as of 2010. There are 4 streets.

Geography 
Azangulovo is located 33 km southeast of Bolsheustyikinskoye (the district's administrative centre) by road. Taishevo is the nearest rural locality.

References 

Rural localities in Mechetlinsky District